The Big Bad Fox and Other Tales… is a 2017 French/Belgian animated anthology comedy film directed by Benjamin Renner and Patrick Imbert, adapted from Renner's own comic books The Big Bad Fox and Un bébé à livrer. Originally conceived as half-hour TV specials, the three segments are linked together by a frame narrative.

The film premiered at the Annecy International Animated Film Festival on 15 June 2017, and was later released by StudioCanal in France on 21 June.

Plot
The film begins in a theater with a group of animals preparing a show. The Fox, the host of the show, tells the audience they will share three different stories, most of which take place on a French farm led by animals. After speaking with the audience, the play begins when the animals  tell Fox they're ready.

Baby Delivery
On the farm, Stork claims to have a broken wing and leaves a baby named Pauline whom he was to deliver to Avignon in the hands of a trio of farm animals: Pig, Rabbit and Duck. The last two are immature and clumsy, therefore, potentially dangerous to the baby. Initially, Pig refuses to take care of Pauline, but he tries to compensate for Rabbit and Duck’s weaknesses so that little Pauline finds her parents. After several clumsy and misunderstood events from Pig nearly being devoured by a pike to getting mixed up with mailing Pauline to China instead of Tarsiar they encountered along their journey, the trio manages to leave Pauline with her family, sadly saying goodbye to her. Once they get back to the farm, Pig discovers Stork was lying to the trio because he's just too lazy to do his job. Pig takes this calmly just so he can put Stork in a catapult and fling him away.

The Big Bad Fox
A Fox who lives in the forest fails in trying to eat the chickens of the farm. One of them can easily protect herself, and Fox always ends up eating radishes that Pig leaves for him. He later takes the advice of Wolf in stealing 3 chicken eggs at night, planning to eat them once they're fat. But the Chicks accept him as their mother, and he gradually gets attached to them, to the point of deciding to protect them from Wolf. Fox decides to run away to the farm with the Chicks. He fools Wolf by eating radishes instead of the Chicks and takes shelter on the farm by disguising himself as a chicken. He discovers with horror that the lead Chicken, whose eggs he had stolen, has sworn revenge and created a Fox Extermination Club in which she trains the other chickens in self-defense. Fox manages to hide for some time, but he is betrayed by the behavior of his chicks who, deciding to be foxes, bite their friends at school and even bring Fox a living one for dinner. Fox tries to scold them, but the Chicks, disappointed by his behavior, decide to return to the forest and make Wolf their new mother. Discovered, Fox is martyred by the Chickens, as he tries in vain to prevent the danger to the Chicks. Tossed out of the farm by explosives, Dog tries to convince the lead Chicken to help him. Fox lands in the forest in the arms of Wolf who was about to eat the Chicks. He helps them and manages to hold off the Wolf while the chicks run away. The lead Chicken, who is the chicks’ biological mother, finally finds them, and after hearing of Wolf's plan that he told Fox to do, she and a group of chickens manage to defeat Wolf. The lead Chicken wants the Chicks to return, leaving Fox heartbroken, but the Chicks rush to him. The lead Chicken decides on an agreement with Fox: Fox continues to see the Chicks regularly and, in exchange, he helps the chickens to train themselves in self-defense against other predators.

Saving Christmas
On the farm, the animals prepare for the Christmas festivities. By multiplying nonsense and disasters, Rabbit and Duck destroy a plastic Santa that was hanging from the barn, and they're convinced they have killed the true Santa. Despite Pig's explanation, they are planning to take Santa’s place to deliver the gifts to children around the world. Pig tries to stop them but is dragged along with them to the city, then taken to the pound, where the three animals are locked up with a pack of dogs. The cunning and resourcefulness of the three companions, fortunately, allows them to get off the hook, and after some clumsy events, Rabbit and Duck see another Santa clinging to a windowsill, but this time, it is the real Santa Claus. They manage to save him, and as a reward, Santa takes the trio back to the farm. The next morning, they wake up with presents.

Epilogue
The end credits begin with a return to the stage of all the characters. As the credits roll, various characters appear, including a frog sweeper, who is cleaning up the scene.

Voice cast

Yves Yan as the Tarsiar from a Chinese zoo who is only able to speak mandarin.

Reception
The film received largely positive reviews from critics. On review aggregator website Rotten Tomatoes, it holds a 97% score based on 30 reviews, with an average rating of 7.34/10. The site's consensus states: "The Big Bad Fox and Other Tales uses its simple, classic animation style to tell a series of equally undemanding - yet utterly beguiling - stories the whole family can enjoy." Metacritic reports a 73 out of 100 rating, based on 4 reviews, indicating "generally favorable reviews".

References

External links
Folivari official site
Panique! Production official site

2010s children's animated films
2010s French animated films
2017 animated films
2017 films
Animated films about animals
Animated films about foxes
Animated films based on comics
Animated anthology films
Belgian animated films
Films based on French comics
Flash animated films
French anthology films
 French Christmas films